Brazil competed at the 2003 Pan American Games, held in Santo Domingo, Dominican Republic, from 1 to 17 August 2003.

Medalists
The following competitors from Brazil won medals at the games. In the by discipline sections below, medalists' names are bolded.

Results by event

Athletics

Track

Road

Field

Basketball

Men's tournament
Marcelinho Machado
Arnaldinho Filho
Dede Barbosa
Valtinho Silva
Murilo da Rosa
Demétrius Ferraciu
Alex Garcia
Anderson Varejão
Guilherme Giovannoni
Tiago Splitter
André Pereira
Renato Pinto
Head coach:
Lula Ferreira

Boxing

Swimming

Men's competitions

Women's competitions

Triathlon

See also
Brazil at the 2004 Summer Olympics

References

 Official website of the Brazilian Olympic Committee

Nations at the 2003 Pan American Games
Pan American Games
2003